There are numerous ethnic groups in Bhutan, but the Ngalop people who speak the Dzongkha language constitute a majority of the Bhutanese population. The Bhutanese are of four main ethnic groups, which themselves are not necessarily exclusive: the politically and culturally dominant Ngalop of western and northern Bhutan; the Sharchop of eastern Bhutan; the Lhotshampa concentrated in southern Bhutan; and Bhutanese tribal and aboriginal peoples living in villages scattered throughout Bhutan.

Ngalop
The Ngalop (meaning "earliest risen" or "first converted" according to folk etymology) are people of Tibetan origin who migrated to Bhutan as early as the ninth century. For this reason, they are often referred to in literature as "Bhote" (people of Bhutia/Bhotia or Tibet). The Ngalop introduced Tibetan culture and Buddhism to Bhutan and were the dominant political and cultural element in modern Bhutan. Their language, Dzongkha, is the national language and is descended from Old Tibetan. The Ngalop are dominant in western and northern Bhutan, including Thimphu and the Dzongkha-speaking region. The term Ngalop may subsume several related linguistic and cultural groups, such as the Kheng people and Bumthang people.

Sharchop
The Sharchop (meaning "easterner"), 
are the populations of mixed Tibetan, South Asian and Southeast Asian descent that mostly live in the eastern districts of Bhutan. Van Driem (1993) indicates the Sharchop and closely related aboriginal Monpa (Menba) are descendants of the plurality ethnicity of Bhutan and the principal pre-Tibetan (pre-Dzongkha) people of that country. The Sharchop account for most of the population of eastern Bhutan. Although long the biggest single ethnic group in Bhutan, the Sharchop have been largely assimilated into the Tibetan-Ngalop culture. Most Sharchop speak Tshangla, a Tibeto-Burman language. Because of their proximity to India, some speak Assamese or Hindi. They traditionally practice slash-and-burn and tsheri agriculture, planting dry rice crops for three or four years until the soil is exhausted and then moving on, however the practice has been officially banned since 1969.

Lhotshampa
The Lhotshampa are generally classified as Hindus. However, this is an oversimplification as many groups that include the Tamang and the Gurung are largely Buddhist; the Kiranti groups that include the Rai and Limbu are largely animist followers of Mundhum (these latter groups are mainly found in eastern Bhutan). Their main festivals include Dashain and Tihar.

Traditionally, Lhotshampa have been involved mostly in sedentary agriculture, although some have cleared forest cover and conducted tsheri agriculture. The most divisive issue in Bhutan in the 1980s and early 1990s was the accommodation of the Nepalese Hindu minority. The government traditionally attempted to limit immigration and restrict residence and employment of Nepalese to the southern region. Liberalization measures in the 1970s and 1980s encouraged intermarriage and provided increasing opportunities for public service. More in-country migration by Nepalese seeking better education and business opportunities was allowed. However, through the late 1980s and 1990s, as many as 107,000 Lhotshampa fled Bhutan for Nepal in fear of persecution. Many Bhutanese refugees still reside in UNHCR refugee camps in Nepal, though many have been resettled to third countries.

Indigenous and tribal groups
Small aboriginal or indigenous tribal peoples live in scattered villages throughout Bhutan. Some are culturally and linguistically part of the populations of West Bengal or Assam and have embraced the Hindu system of endogamous groups ranked by hierarchy and practice wet-rice and dry-rice agriculture. They include the Brokpa, Lepcha, and Doya tribes as well as the descendants of slaves who were brought to Bhutan from similar tribal areas in India. The ex-slave communities tended to be near traditional population centers because it was there that they had been pressed into service to the state. Some like the Black Mountain Monpa are said to represent the aboriginal people of Bhutan, while some like the Brokpa probably originally migrated from Tibet. Together, the Ngalop, Sharchop, and tribal groups constituted up to 72 percent of the population in the late 1980s according to official Bhutanese statistics. The CIA Factbook, however, estimates Ngalop and Sharchop populations together to total about 50 percent, with indigenous and migrant tribes constituting 15 percent – or 65 percent altogether.

Tibetans
Bhutan also had a sizable modern Tibetan refugee population, although there are no Tibetan communities or villages in the country.  The total Tibetan population stood at 10,000 in 1987. The major influx of 6,000 persons came in 1959 in the wake of the 1959 Tibetan Rebellion. The Tibetan expatriates became only partially integrated into Bhutanese society. At the time, when the King fell sick, there was a problem of who would inherit and carry on the monarchy line; son of a Tibetan queen or a Bhutanese Queen. When the conflict was occurring, the king secretly sent his Tibetan wife and her family to India. However the Tibetans in Bhutan had to suffer the consequence. Some of the Tibetans were secretly taken from their home and sent to prison. Many of those people, dead in prison and some were sent to remote places for many years. The general Tibetan public in Bhutan only heard about it later on. So, the Tibetans in Bhutan requested to have them sent to India where their beloved spiritual leader was. Perceiving a lack of allegiance to the state on the part of Tibetans, the government decided in 1979 to expel to India those who refused residency.  The Tibetans were separated into three groups. India, after some reluctance, acceded to the move and accepted more than 3,100 Tibetans between 1980 and 1985. The first two groups of Tibetans were sent to India and have found their own community. However the third group is still in Bhutan. They do not have a Bhutanese passport because they were part of a group that wanted to leave Bhutan. However, there are other Tibetans who have Bhutanese residency because they accepted the offer to live in Bhutan instead of going to India. Although Bhutan traditionally welcomed refugees—and still accepted a few new ones fleeing the 1989 unrest in Tibet—government policy in the late 1980s was to refuse more Tibetan refugees.

See also
Ngalop
Sharchop
Lhotshampa
Lepcha
Demographics of Bhutan
Languages of Bhutan
Immigration in Bhutan
Bhutanese refugees
Ancient Tribal population
Orson Tribe

References

 
Society of Bhutan